Parhedylidae are a taxonomic family of sea slugs, marine gastropod mollusks in the superfamily Parhedyloidea.

2005 taxonomy
Microhedylidae has been listed as a synonym of Parhedylidae in the taxonomy of Bouchet & Rocroi (2005). Ganitidae Rankin, 1979 has been listed as a sole family within Hedylopsoidea. The type genus of Livorniellidae was Livorniella Rankin, 1979.

2010 taxonomy
Sensu Schrödl & Neusser (2010) is Microhedylidae within the clade Microhedylacea. Parhedylidae is a synonym of Microhedylidae. Microhedylidae s.l. may informally include Ganitidae, but inclusion of Ganitidae within Microhedylidae requires further research and higher statistical support.

Genera
Genera within the Parhedylidae include:
 Ganitus Marcus, 1953 - with the only species Ganitus evelinae Marcus, 1953 - it belongs to Microhedylidae s.l. / Ganitidae
 Microhedyle Hertling, 1930
 Microhedyle glandulifera (Kowalevsky, 1901)
 Microhedyle nahantensis (Doe, 1974)
 Microhedyle odhneri (Ev. Marcus & Er. Marcus, 1955)
 Microhedyle remanei (Er. Marcus, 1953)
 Paraganitus Challis, 1968 - with the only species Paraganitus ellynnae Challis, 1968 - it belongs to Microhedylidae s.l. / Ganitidae
 Paraganitus Challis, 1968
 Parhedyle Thiele, 1931
 Parhedyle cryptophthalma (Westheide & Wawra, 1974)
 Parhedyle tyrtowii (Kowalevsky, 1900)
 Parhedyle gerlachi (Ev. Marcus & Er. Marcus, 1959)
 Pontohedyle Golikov & Starobogatov, 1972
Genera brought into synonymy
 Gastrohedyle Rankin, 1979: synonym of Pontohedyle Golikov & Starobogatov, 1972
 Livorniella Rankin, 1979: synonym of Microhedyle Hertling, 1930
 Mancohedyle Rankin, 1979: synonym of Pontohedyle Golikov & Starobogatov, 1972 (junior objective synontm of Pontohedyle)
 Maraunibina Rankin, 1979: synonym of Pontohedyle Golikov & Starobogatov, 1972
 Parahedyle [sic]: synonym of Parhedyle Thiele, 1931 (misspelling)
 Sabulincola Rankin, 1979: synonym of Parhedyle Thiele, 1931
 Stellaspina Rankin, 1979: synonym of Microhedyle Hertling, 1930
 Unela Er. Marcus, 1953: synonym of Microhedyle Hertling, 1930

Cladogram
A cladogram based on sequences of mitochondrial 28S ribosomal RNA, 16S ribosomal RNA and cytochrome-c oxidase I (COI) genes showing phylogenic relations within the family Microhedylidae:

References

External links
 

 
Gastropod families